The economy of Chad suffers from the landlocked country's geographic remoteness, drought, lack of infrastructure, and political turmoil. About 85% of the population depends on agriculture, including the herding of livestock. Of Africa's Francophone countries, Chad benefited least from the 50% devaluation of their currencies in January 1994. Financial aid from the World Bank, the African Development Bank, and other sources is directed largely at the improvement of agriculture, especially livestock production. Because of lack of financing, the development of oil fields near Doba, originally due to finish in 2000, was delayed until 2003. It was finally developed and is now operated by ExxonMobil. In terms of gross domestic product, Chad ranks 143rd globally with $11.051 billion dollars as of 2018.

Agriculture
Chad produced in 2018:

 969 thousand tons of sorghum;
 893 thousand tons of peanut butter;
 756 thousand tons of millet;
 484 thousand tonnes of yam (8th largest producer in the world);
 475 thousand tons of sugarcane;
 437 thousand tons of maize;
 284 thousand tons of cassava;
 259 thousand tons of rice;
 255 thousand tons of sweet potato;
 172 thousand tons of sesame seed;
 151 thousand tons of bean;
 120 thousand tons of cotton;

In addition to smaller productions of other agricultural products.

Macro-economic trend
The following table shows the main economic indicators in 1980–2017.

Other statistics
GDP:
purchasing power parity – $28.62 billion (2017 est.)

GDP – real growth rate:
-3.1% (2017 est.)

GDP – per capita:
$2,300 (2017 est.)

Gross national saving: 
15.5% of GDP (2017 est.)

GDP – composition by sector:
agriculture:
52.3% (2017 est.) 
industry:
14.7% (2017 est.)  
services:
33.1% (2017 est.)

Population below poverty line::
46.7% (2011 est.)

Distribution of family income – Gini index:
43.3 (2011 est.)

Inflation rate (consumer prices):
-0.9% (2017 est.)

Labor force:
5.654 million (2017 est.)

Labor force – by occupation:
agriculture 80%, industry and services 20% (2006 est.)

Budget:
revenues:
1.337 billion (2017 est.) 
expenditures:
1.481 billion (2017 est.)

Budget surplus (+) or deficit (-):
-1.5% (of GDP) (2017 est.)

Public debt: 
52.5% of GDP (2017 est.) 
 
Industries:
oil, cotton textiles, brewing, natron (sodium carbonate), soap, cigarettes, construction materials

Industrial production growth rate:
-4% (2017 est.)

electrification: total population: 4%  (2013)

electrification: urban areas: 14% (2013)

electrification: rural areas: 1% (2013)

Electricity – production:
224.3 million kWh (2016 est.)

Electricity – production by source:
fossil fuel:
98%
hydro:
0%
nuclear:
0%
other renewable:
3% (2017)

Electricity – consumption:
208.6 million kWh (2016 est.)

Electricity – exports:
0 kWh (2016 est.)

Electricity – imports:
0 kWh (2016 est.)

Agriculture – products:
cotton, sorghum, millet, peanuts, sesame, corn, rice, potatoes, onions, cassava (manioc, tapioca), cattle, sheep, goats, camels

Exports:
$2.464 billion (2017 est.)

Exports – commodities:
oil, livestock, cotton, sesame, gum arabic, shea butter

Exports – partners:
US 38.7%, China 16.6%, Netherlands 15.7%, UAE 12.2%, India 6.3% (2017)

Imports:
$2.16 billion (2017 est.)

Imports – commodities:
machinery and transportation equipment, industrial goods, foodstuffs, textiles

Imports – partners:
China 19.9%, Cameroon 17.2%, France 17%, US 5.4%, India 4.9%, Senegal 4.5% (2017)

Debt – external:
$1.724 billion (31 December 2017 est.)

Reserves of foreign exchange and gold:
$22.9 million (31 December 2017 est.)

See also
 Chad
 Economy of Africa
 Petroleum industry in Chad
 United Nations Economic Commission for Africa

References

General

External links
 
 Chad latest trade data on ITC Trade Map
 World Bank – Chad-Cameroon Pipeline Project

 
Chad
Chad